Princess Eudoxia of Bulgaria (5 January 1898 – 4 October 1985) was the eldest daughter and third child of King Ferdinand I of Bulgaria and his first wife, Princess Marie Louise of Bourbon-Parma. She was a devoted sister and confidante to King Boris III.

Biography 

Born on 5 January 1898 in Sofia, Princess Eudoxia was the third child and first daughter of Ferdinand I, Prince of Bulgaria (later King of Bulgaria), and his first wife, Princess Marie Louise of Bourbon-Parma. She had two older brothers and one younger sister. Eudoxia was exactly one year old when mother, Marie, died in childbirth while giving birth to Eudoxia's younger sister Nadejda.

From an early age, Eudoxia was interested in the fine arts. Princess Eudoxia never married; although, there were persistent rumors that she wished to marry a man of Bulgarian descent, which was dynastically unacceptable at that time. She devoted her life to Bulgaria and acted as First Lady of the Land until King Boris III married Princess Giovanna of Savoy.

In 1922, Eudoxia and her sister Princess Nadejda became the confidants of King Boris III of Bulgaria. She became First Lady of the Land until King Boris married.

After 9 September 1944, Princess Eudoxia was arrested and tortured by the Communists. She was released and allowed to flee the country with the rest of the royal family. She later settled in Germany, where she lived close to her sister Princess Nadezhda. She died on 4 October 1985, at the age of 87.

In the book Giovanna of Bulgaria: The Queen of Charity, the author wrote:…Eudoxie had an exceptional personality, with a quick mind, alert, watchful eyes, an uncanny feeling for people and events. Of all of King Ferdinand's children she is said to have inherited most of his typical character traits. Usually kind and witty, she could be sharp, critical and even sarcastic towards those she thought deserved it. Her authoritarian behaviour towards people contrasted with her full and utter devotion to her brother. She spent the happiest and most difficult times for the crown at his side…

Literature
 Hans-Joachim Böttcher: Ferdinand von Sachsen-Coburg und Gotha 1861–1948: Ein Kosmopolit auf dem bulgarischen Thron. Osteuropazentrum-Berlin-Verlag (Anthea-Verlagsgruppe), Berlin 2019, pp. 391–392 a.o.

Arms

Ancestors

References

Ruvigny's Titled Nobility of Europe, by Burkes Peerage Ltd., 1914.
Crown of Thorns, by Stephane Groueff, Lanham (MD) and London, 1987. .

External links

1898 births
1985 deaths
Bulgarian princesses
House of Saxe-Coburg and Gotha (Bulgaria)
Princesses of Saxe-Coburg and Gotha
Daughters of kings